Jaipur Kathak Kendra is a teaching institution of Kathak. It was established by Government of Rajasthan in 1978 in Jaipur to patronise and develop the Jaipur Gharana of Kathak. The present Acharya is Dr. Rekha Thakar.

See also
 Kathak Kendra

References 
Cultural programme by Jaipur Kathak Kendra
 Kathak fest in Jaipur

Organisations based in Jaipur
Kathak
Cultural organisations based in India
Rajasthani culture
Dance schools in India
Organizations established in 1978
1978 establishments in Rajasthan
State agencies of Rajasthan